In February 2002, twenty years after the original publication of the magazine Fast Folk, Smithsonian Folkways released a two-CD compilation album of 36 tracks selected from the magazine's fifteen-year history titled Fast Folk: A Community of Singers & Songwriters.

Track listing 

Disc 1:
 "American Jerusalem" (Rod MacDonald) – 5:58
 "What's Wrong With the Man Upstairs" (David Massengill) – 4:38
 "Old Factory Town" (Gerry Devine) – 5:12
 "Just Need a Home (Spotlight)" (Lucy Kaplansky) – 3:38
 "Another Time and Place" (Dave Van Ronk) – 4:31
 "I Don't Know Why" (Shawn Colvin) – 3:45
 "Geza's Wailing Ways" (John Gorka) – 3:53
 "Ragman!" (David Indian) – 4:03
 "High Times" (Tom Intondi) – 4:36
 "Don't Ever Call Your Sweetheart by His Name" (Christine Lavin) – 2:21
 "Where Were You Last Night?" (Frank Christian) – 4:19
 "Introduction to Corpo Gracile" (Germana Pucci) – :28
 "Corpo Gracile" (Germana Pucci) – 5:13
 "Kilkelly, Ireland" (Laura Burns, Roger Rosen) – 5:58
 "Introduction to the Viking Rag" (Erik Frandsen) – 1:32
 "The Viking Rag" (Erik Frandsen) – 2:37
 "Forget-Me-Not" (Jack Hardy) – 4:20
 "Vacation" (Bill Bachmann) – 2:41

Disc 2:
 "Gypsy" (Suzanne Vega) – 4:16
 "Thirty Thousand Men" (Steve Forbert) – 4:31
 "Margaret" (Frank Tedesso) – 4:04
 "Share the Failure" (Elaine Silver) – 2:55
 "Bourbon as a Second Language" (Patrick John Brayer) – 3:47
 "King of Hearts" (Paul Kaplan) – 4:10
 "Heart on Ice" (Judith Zweiman) – 5:04
 "The Courier" (Richard Shindell) – 5:00
 "By Your Eyes" (Wendy Beckerman) – 3:22
 "Danton" (Lillie Palmer) – 4:27
 "Long Black Wall" (Michael Jerling) – 4:27
 "Railroad Bill" (Andy Breckman) – 3:32
 "Gravedigger" (Richard Julian) – 3:18
 "January Cold" (Richard Meyer) – 5:11
 "Disenchanted" (Eric Wood) – 4:37
 "Raphael" (Hugh Blumenfeld) – 3:35
 "Your Face" (Louise Taylor) – 3:18
 "Crazy Horse" (Josh Joffen & Late for Dinner) – 3:18

References

External links 
 [ Fast Folk: A Community of Singers and Songwriters] album entry at Allmusic

2002 compilation albums
Folk compilation albums
Smithsonian Folkways compilation albums